Mohammad Sami (born 1981) is a Pakistani cricket fast bowler.

Mohammad Sami may also refer to:
 Mohammad Sami (cricketer, born 1984), Pakistani first-class cricketer
 Mohammad Sami Agha (born 1989), Afghan cricketer
 Mohammed Shami (born 1990), Indian cricketer
 Mohammad Sami (professor) (born 1955), Indian theoretical physicist and cosmologist
 Mohammad Samir Hossain (born 1976), Bangladeshi theorist